USS LST-543 was a United States Navy  in commission from 1944 to 1946.

Construction and commissioning
LST-543 was laid down on 6 December 1943 at Evansville, Indiana, by the Missouri Valley Bridge and Iron Company. She was launched on 1 February 1944, sponsored by Lieutenant, junior grade, Helen C. Hanson, USNR, and commissioned on 6 March 1944.

Service history
During World War II, LST-543 initially was assigned to the European Theater of Operations and participated in Operation Overlord, the invasion of Normandy, in June 1944.

LST-543 then was assigned to the Pacific Theater of Operations and took part in the assault on and occupation of Okinawa in May and June 1945.

Following the war, LST-543 performed occupation duty in the Far East and saw service in China until early May 1946, when she returned to the United States.

Decommissioning and disposal
LST-543 was decommissioned on 31 May 1946 and stricken from the Navy List on 17 July 1947. She was sold to Bosey in the Philippines on 5 December 1947.

Honors and awards
LST-543 earned two battle stars for World War II service.

References

NavSource Online: Amphibious Photo Archive LST-543

 

LST-542-class tank landing ships
World War II amphibious warfare vessels of the United States
Ships built in Evansville, Indiana
1944 ships